Land and Shade is a 2015 Colombian drama film written and directed by César Augusto Acevedo and produced by the production company Burning Blue. It was screened in the International Critics' Week section at the 2015 Cannes Film Festival where it won the Caméra d'Or Award, France 4 Visionary Award and SACD Award. The film has been in development since 2009 and has since received support and funding from several international institutions.

Plot
After 17 years, an old farmer named Alfonso returns to his home because his son is gravely ill, where the woman who was once his wife still lives, with his daughter-in-law and grandson. His house is surrounded by large sugar cane plantations, which produce ash rain that worsen, and most likely was the cause of the illness. Now, Alfonso will try to regain the love of his family and take care of them.

Cast
 Haimer Leal as Alfonso
 Hilda Ruiz as Alicia
 Edison Raigosa as Geraldo
 Marleyda Soto as Esperanza
 Felipe Cárdenas as Manuel

Reception 
The film received positive reviews from critics. Review aggregation website Rotten Tomatoes gives it a 93% approval rating, based on 14 reviews, with an average score of 7.9/10. On Metacritic, which assigns a normalised rating, the film has a score of 74 out of 100 based on 11 critics. Noel Murray from The A.V. Club wrote: "Acevedo has a wonderful command of visual storytelling, as evidenced by how well he frames those dark interiors; he and Guzmán [his cameraman] use every spare beam of light to illuminate the edges of his characters". Adam Morgan from the Chicago Reader also gave a positive review from the film and its cinematography: "The film is beautifully composed and full of striking images, but Acevedo's ruthless depiction of hardship makes this hard to watch". Peter Debruge from Variety wrote: "Cesar Acevedo's deliberately paced and distant-feeling debut works its way under audiences' skin, weaving a haunting allegory through painterly compositions.".

References

External links
 
 

2015 films
2010s Spanish-language films
Films set in Colombia
Films shot in Colombia
Caméra d'Or winners
Colombian drama films
2015 drama films
2010s Colombian films
2010s Chilean films
2010s French films